Abner is an unincorporated community in Kaufman County, located in the U.S. state of Texas. It is located within the Dallas/Fort Worth Metroplex.

History
The community was initially known as Johnson's Point starting in 1871, named after Abner Johnson, who settled the area in the 1840s after piloting a keelboat on the Trinity River two years prior. A post office under that name opened in 1871, but only lasted for two years, giving up its mail service to Terrell. The community changed its name to Abner in 1885, when a new post office opened, remaining open through 1903. After that, mail was sent from Kaufman. The community had 25 residents, as well as a barber, two doctors, and a general store in 1890. It gained ten more residents six years later.

Geography

Education
Abner's first school district, named Johnson's Point, was established in 1885 by the Kaufman County Commissioner's Court. It joined the Kaufman Independent School District in 1949.

References

Unincorporated communities in Kaufman County, Texas
Unincorporated communities in Texas